Intense Tropical Cyclone Japhet was a damaging tropical cyclone that affected southeast Africa in March 2003. It developed on February 25 near the southwest coast of Madagascar, and initially moved to the northwest before turning to the southwest. After stalling briefly, the cyclone turned to the northwest, weakening slightly before striking Mozambique just south of Vilankulo on March 2. Japhet slowly weakened while progressing inland, dissipating over Zambia on March 6.

Along its path, Japhet dropped heavy rainfall that caused widespread river flooding. The rains occurred after an extended drought, although excessive precipitation caused heavy crop damage, notably around where the storm moved ashore. In two provinces in Mozambique, the cyclone damaged or destroyed 25,000 houses, leaving at least 23,000 people homeless. Flooding in Zambia caused rivers to rise in Mozambique several days after the storm's passage. There were 17 deaths in Mozambique. Further inland, remnant rainfall destroyed a bridge and several houses in Zimbabwe, killing eight people.

Meteorological history

On February 23, the Joint Typhoon Warning Center (JTWC) began monitoring an area of convection in the Mozambique Channel. On February 25, Météo France (MF) initiated advisories on Tropical Disturbance 13 when the system was located along the southwest coast of Madagascar. Later that day, the JTWC issued a Tropical Cyclone Formation Alert, noting that environmental conditions favored development, including weak wind shear. The system developed organized convection in a circular pattern, and on February 26, the MF and JTWC upgraded the system to Tropical Depression 13 and Tropical Cyclone 19S, respectively. With a mid-level ridge to the south, the depression moved generally westward, and after intensifying further, it was upgraded to Tropical Storm Japhet by the Direction de la Météorologie et de l'Hydrologie of Madagascar late on February 26.

After attaining tropical storm status, Japhet quickly intensified while it began moving to the southwest, due to a break in the ridge. This was about 12 hours after the JTWC upgraded Japhet to the same intensity but with 1 minute sustained winds. After further intensification, the cyclone peaked in intensity on March 1.

Cyclone Japhet maintained its peak winds for about 24 hours, during which it remained nearly stationary. Subsequently, the storm began a northwest track toward the Mozambique coast, gradually weakening due to decreased outflow and dry air. The cyclone gradually weakened over land, decreasing below tropical cyclone status by early on March 3. Japhet crossed into southern Zimbabwe, and both JTWC and MF discontinued warnings before Japhet dissipated on March 5.

Impact and aftermath

While Japhet was developing, the pressure gradient between it and a ridge produced winds of 93 km/h (58 mph) on Europa Island in the Mozambique Channel. Heavy rains affected southwestern Madagascar, but there was no major damage.

Before Japhet struck Mozambique, the local Red Cross office mobilized volunteers, including 100 people in Inhambane Province who assisted local officials in preparations. The cyclone affected the same region that Cyclone Delfina struck two months prior. Japhet produced high winds and heavy rainfall in southern and central Mozambique into southern Zimbabwe. The rains were beneficial in alleviating drought conditions, and dry grounds absorbed much of the excess rainfall. After entering Zimbabwe, Japhet's rainfall caused the Save River to rise, causing flooding in southern Mozambique several days after the storm passed the area. The resulting floods affected 50,000 people in several villages. The Limpopo River also rose to above-normal level. High rains also caused some crop damage, destroying 237,000 hectares (585,600 acres) of crop fields. This included 12,325 downed cashew trees, 6,955 wrecked banana plants, and 2,495 killed livestock, all in Vilankulo; however, the rains allowed farming conditions to improve due to wetter conditions in drought areas.

There, the winds destroyed the roofs or damaged the doors and windows of 95% of brick houses. In Inhambane Province in southern Mozambique, the cyclone destroyed several boats, cut power lines, and disrupted roads with flooding or downed trees, which prevented communication with the province. The storm destroyed 500 classrooms, 35 government buildings, and 7 health facilities. The cyclone damaged or destroyed 25,000 houses in Inhambane and Sofala provinces, leaving about 23,000 people homeless in Inhambane alone, which was the worst-affected province. Three people were injured in Morrumbene by a fallen tree. There were 17 deaths in the country, which was less than from previous cyclones due to advance warning and coordinated government action.

The Zambia Meteorological Department warned of the potential of intense precipitation before Japhet moved into the region. In neighboring Zimbabwe, ten hours of high rainfall nearly overtopped the Manyuchi Dam and destroyed a bridge. The storm also damaged crops and destroyed houses in the country, killing eight people.

After the storm struck Mozambique, the World Food Programme distributed more than 4,300 tons of food to affected citizens. The agency had to transport goods via helicopter due to damaged or flooded roads. The country's primary north–south highway, which was damaged by the storm, had emergency repairs and was reopened within three days. Mozambique's National Disaster Management Institute distributed  of maize,  of beans, and 80 tents to storm victims. Lingering floods in Zimbabwe contributed to an increase in malaria cases. The Delta Corporation donated $6 million worth of blankets and food to residents in the country.

References

External links

Joint Typhoon Warning Center (JTWC) .
Météo France (RSMC La Réunion).
World Meteorological Organization

2002–03 South-West Indian Ocean cyclone season
South-West Indian Ocean tropical cyclones
Cyclones in Mozambique
Japhet